Mnesithea, or  jointtail grass, is a genus of Asian, Australian, and Pacific Island plants in the grass family.

 Species
 Mnesithea annua (Lazarides) de Koning & Sosef - Western Australia
 Mnesithea formosa (R.Br.) de Koning & Sosef - Lesser Sunda Islands, New Guinea, Western Australia, Northern Territory, Queensland
 Mnesithea laevis (Retz.) Kunth - Fujian, Guangdong, Guangxi, Hainan, Taiwan, Japan incl Nansei-shotō, India, Indonesia, Pakistan, Philippines, Sri Lanka, Thailand, Vietnam; Pacific Islands 
 Mnesithea mollicoma (Hance) A.Camus - Guangdong, Guangxi, Thailand, Vietnam, Palawan, Java, Malaysia, Philippines, Sulawesi
 Mnesithea pilosa B.K.Simon - Queensland
 Mnesithea × thailandica Traiperm & Boonkerd - Thailand
 Mnesithea veldkampii Potdar, S.P.Gaikwad, Salunkhe & S.R.Yadav - Maharashtra

 formerly included
see Coelorachis Hackelochloa Heteropholis Ophiuros Ratzeburgia Rhytachne Rottboellia

References

Andropogoneae
Poaceae genera
Taxa named by Carl Sigismund Kunth